2nd Lt. George Allison Whiteman (October 12, 1919 – December 7, 1941) was an American military aviator, and was one of the 2,403 victims killed during the surprise attack on Pearl Harbor by Imperial Japanese Navy forces.

Whiteman Air Force Base is named for him.

Biography 
Whiteman, the eldest of 10 children of John and Earlie Whiteman, was born in Pettis County, Missouri, at the Wilkerson farm near Longwood. He graduated from Smith-Cotton High School in Sedalia and attended the Rolla School of Mines (later University of Missouri-Rolla and now Missouri S&T) before enlisting in the service in 1939.

In the spring of 1940, Whiteman received orders to report to Randolph Field, Texas, for training as an aviator. On November 15, 1940, he was commissioned a second lieutenant in the Army Air Corps (later Army Air Forces) and volunteered for duty in Hawaii early the following year.

As the Japanese attack on Pearl Harbor began, Lt. Whiteman went to his P-40B Warhawk aircraft at Bellows Field and had just lifted off the runway when a burst of Japanese gunfire hit his cockpit, wounding him and throwing the plane out of control. The plane crashed and burned just off the end of the runway.  Whiteman died from his injuries.

The news of his death reached his family at 10:13 p.m. the same day.  In an interview with the Sedalia Democrat that night, his mother said: "It's hard to believe. It might have happened anytime, anywhere. We've got to sacrifice loved ones if we want to win this war." She gave the reporter a photograph of her son sitting in an aircraft with the inscription "Lucky, lucky me."

Whiteman was one of the first airmen killed during the assault which marked the United States entry into World War II, and is considered the first American pilot killed in aerial combat in World War II while serving under American forces. For his gallantry that day, Lieutenant Whiteman was posthumously awarded the Silver Star, the Purple Heart, the American Defense Medal with a Foreign Service clasp, the American Campaign Medal, the Asiatic-Pacific Campaign Medal with one bronze star, and the World War II Victory Medal.

On August 24, 1955, 14 years after Whiteman's death, Air Force Chief of Staff Gen. Nathan F. Twining informed Whiteman's mother that the recently reopened Sedalia Air Force Base would be renamed Whiteman Air Force Base in tribute to her son. The dedication and renaming ceremony took place on December 3, 1955.

References 

Note: Portions of this web page have been copied verbatim. The page is a work of the United States Government and therefore public domain.

1919 births
1941 deaths
Aviators from Missouri
Recipients of the Silver Star
United States Army Air Forces officers
United States Army Air Forces pilots of World War II
Missouri University of Science and Technology alumni
United States Army Air Forces personnel killed in World War II
Deaths by Japanese airstrikes during the attack on Pearl Harbor